Wang Fang (born 14 January 1967) is a Chinese former basketball player who competed in the 1992 Summer Olympics. She won the Women's Chinese Basketball Association (WCBA) title in 2009 while the head coach of the Liaoning Flying Eagles. Wang was a coach for the Chinese women's team at the 2008 Summer Olympics. Her son, Kevin Zhang, is also a basketball player.

References

1967 births
Living people
Chinese women's basketball players
Basketball players from Liaoning
Sportspeople from Anshan
Basketball players at the 1992 Summer Olympics
Medalists at the 1992 Summer Olympics
Olympic basketball players of China
Olympic silver medalists for China
Olympic medalists in basketball
Asian Games medalists in basketball
Basketball players at the 1990 Asian Games
Basketball players at the 1994 Asian Games
Asian Games silver medalists for China
Asian Games bronze medalists for China
Medalists at the 1990 Asian Games
Medalists at the 1994 Asian Games
Chinese women's basketball coaches
20th-century Chinese women